The Ambivali Caves, or Ambivali Leni, are a group of Buddhist caves near Neral, Raigad district, Maharashtra, 8km southeast of Kalyan. The caves are cut in the low hill located on the concave portion of a river. They consist in 12 viharas celles with verandah and several water cisterns. There is one inscription in Brahmi script on a verandah pillar.

References

Buddhist monasteries in India
Buddhist caves in India
Indian rock-cut architecture
Former populated places in India
Buddhist pilgrimage sites in India
Architecture in India
Caves of Maharashtra